The 2021–22 season was the seventh season of competitive association football and the sixth season in the Liga 1 played by Bali United Football Club, a professional football club based in Gianyar, Bali, Indonesia. Due to the cancellation of 2020 season, mean it is their sixth successive season in Liga 1.

Coming into the season, Bali United are the reigning Liga 1 champions and they succeeded in defending their titles and become the first ever back to back champions. They also qualified for the 2021 AFC Cup group stage. This season is Bali United's third with head coach Stefano Cugurra.

Background 
The 2020 season was Stefano Cugurra's second full season as head coach of Bali United, having taken charge in January 2019. The club had their second Asian competitions appearances as they competed in AFC Champions League, where they knocked out again in the preliminary round 2, this time by Australian side Melbourne Victory. That result made them got a consolation place in the AFC Cup, where they unable to finish as the competition was cancelled due to COVID-19 pandemic in Asia. They also unable to finish the league season as the competition was cancelled and declared void due to the COVID-19 pandemic in Indonesia.

Pre-season and friendlies

Friendlies

Menpora Cup

Match results

Liga 1

AFC Cup

Player details

Appearances and goals 

|-
! colspan="10"| Players transferred out during the season

Disciplinary record 

|-
! colspan="13"| Players transferred out during the season

Transfers

Transfers in

Transfers out

Loans in

Loans out

Awards 
 Liga 1:
 Player of the Month: Ilija Spasojević (September)
 Top Goalscorer: Ilija Spasojević (23 goals)
 Team of the Season: Éber Bessa, Brwa Nouri, Ilija Spasojević

Notes

References 

Bali United F.C. seasons
Bali United
Bali United